Diogene Bitunguramye is a Rwandan politician, currently a member of the Chamber of Deputies in the Parliament of Rwanda.

References

Living people
Members of the Chamber of Deputies (Rwanda)
Year of birth missing (living people)
Place of birth missing (living people)